Anne Isabella, Lady Ritchie ( Thackeray; 9 June 1837 – 26 February 1919), eldest daughter of William Makepeace Thackeray, was an English writer, whose several novels were appreciated in their time and made her a central figure on the late Victorian literary scene. She is noted especially as the custodian of her father's literary legacy, and for short fiction that places fairy tale narratives in a Victorian milieu. Her 1885 novel Mrs. Dymond introduced into English the proverb, "Give a man a fish and you feed him for a day; teach a man to fish and you feed him for life."

Life
Anne Isabella Thackeray was born in London, the eldest daughter of William Makepeace Thackeray and his wife Isabella Gethin Shawe (1816–1893). She had two younger sisters: Jane, born in 1839, who died at eight months, and Harriet Marian "Minny" (1840–1875), who married Leslie Stephen in 1869. Anne, whose father called her Anny, spent her childhood in France and England, where she and her sister were accompanied by the future poet Anne Evans.

In 1877, she married her cousin, Richmond Ritchie, who was 17 years her junior. They had two children, Hester and Billy. She was a step-aunt of Virginia Woolf, who penned an obituary of her in the Times Literary Supplement. She is also thought to have inspired the character of Mrs Hilbery in Woolf's Night and Day.

Literary career
In 1863, Anne Isabella published The Story of Elizabeth with immediate success. Several other works followed:
The Village on the Cliff (1867)
To Esther, and Other Sketches (1869)
Old Kensington (1873)
Toilers and Spinsters, and Other Essays (1874)
Bluebeard's Keys, and Other Stories (1874)
Five Old Friends (1875)
Madame de Sévigné (1881), a biography with literary excerpts

In other writings, she made unusual use of old folk stories to depict modern situations and occurrences, such as Sleeping Beauty, Cinderella and Little Red Riding Hood.

She also wrote the five novels:
Miss Angel (1875)
From An Island (1877), a semi-autobiographical novella 
Miss Williamson's Divagations (1881)
A Book of Sibyls: Mrs. Barbauld, Mrs. Opie, Miss Edgeworth, Miss Austen (1883)
Mrs. Dymond (1885; reprinted in 1890)

References

Bibliography 

"Introduction" by Anne Thackeray Ritchie in Our Village, fully and openly available online in the Baldwin Library of Historical Children's Literature Digital Collection

Aplin, John. The Inheritance of Genius – A Thackeray Family Biography, 1798–1875, Lutterworth Press (2010). 
Aplin, John. Memory and Legacy – A Thackeray Family Biography, 1876–1919, Lutterworth Press (2011). 
Aplin, John (editor). The Correspondence and Journals of the Thackeray Family, 5 vols., Pickering & Chatto (2011).

External links

Genealogy of Anne Thackeray Ritchie

Anne Isabella Thackeray at Victorian Web

19th-century English novelists
English short story writers
1837 births
1919 deaths
English children's writers
Victorian women writers
British women short story writers
English women novelists
19th-century English women writers
Writers from London
Anne
19th-century British short story writers
Victorian novelists
Wives of knights